The Royal Society of Fine Arts (RSFA) is a non-governmental, non-profit cultural organization, founded in Amman, Jordan in 1979. Its goal is to encourage cultural diversity, disseminate artistic knowledge and promote art from the Islamic and developing countries. It established Jordan National Gallery of Fine Arts.

References

Organisations based in Jordan with royal patronage
1979 establishments in Jordan
Arts organizations established in 1979
Arts in Jordan
Arab art scene